Lona Fay Spain (October 6, 1932 – May 8, 1983) was an American actress in motion pictures and television.

Early years
Born in Phoenix, Arizona, Fay Spain was the younger of two daughters born to Robert C. Spain and Arminta Frances "Mickie" Cochran. When she was 17 years old, Spain worked as a dealer in a casino in Reno, Nevada. Years later, she said, "I lied about my age and got a job as a dealer – and made big money, much more than my husband, who was a shill."

Theater apprentice
Within two months, she found work with a stock company in the Catskill Mountains. She obtained an Equity card, which enabled her to continue working as an actress. Spain eschewed a college scholarship after attending high school in White Salmon, Washington. She chose instead to pursue a stock company apprenticeship.

Film actress
Spain pursued acting, unimpeded by rejection. She accepted any parts that came along, learning the techniques of the acting trade. 

In 1955, Spain was one of 15 actresses who were named WAMPAS Baby Stars. She first came to prominence with movie audiences in the late 1950s. In 1957, she appeared as Carol Smith with John Smith as Tommy Kelly in the dramatic film The Crooked Circle in which a young boxer is pressured to throw a fight. In 1958, she was cast as Darlin' Jill in the film version of God's Little Acre, based on Erskine Caldwell's novel. The film marked the screen debut of Tina Louise and also starred Robert Ryan, Jack Lord, Buddy Hackett, Aldo Ray, and Vic Morrow.

Spain followed this success by playing Maureen Flannery in the film Al Capone (1959), and appeared in such films as The Beat Generation (1959), The Private Lives of Adam and Eve (1960), Hercules and the Conquest of Atlantis (1961), Black Gold (1962), Thunder Island (1963), Flight to Fury (1964), The Gentle Rain (1966), Welcome to Hard Times (1967), and The Todd Killings (1971).

Her final appearance as a film actress came in 1974, when she portrayed the wife of mobster Hyman Roth (Lee Strasberg) in The Godfather Part II (1974).

Marriages
When she was 16, Spain married John Falvo, a screenwriter and actor. They had one son, Jock Falvo (born 1954), and divorced in 1954. In 1959, the actress married West Coast abstract painter John Altoon. From 1965 to 1966, she was married to Imo Ughini, a hairdresser.

Television
Spain starred in 11 episodes of NBC Matinee Theater.

She appeared as a contestant in an episode of the Groucho Marx game show You Bet Your Life (episode #56-02, October 4, 1956, Secret Word 'Hand').
By the middle and late 1950s and 1960s, Spain appeared in
Bonanza (Sue Ellen Terry in "The Sisters" in the first season chapter 14), Gunsmoke (in 1957 as the title character "Mavis McCloud" (S3E7) & in 1961 as "Bessie" a gang member and killer in "A Man A Day" (S7E14), Cheyenne, Rawhide, Whirlybirds, Hogan's Heroes, Perry Mason (Charlotte Lynch in "The Case of the Fiery Fingers"), Tombstone Territory (episode "Pick up the Gun"), The Millionaire, M Squad, Adventures in Paradise, The Texan, Riverboat, The Rat Patrol, Gomer Pyle, USMC, Gunsmoke (episode "Mavis McCloud" (1957) and episode "A Man a Day" (1961)), Playhouse 90, 77 Sunset Strip, Have Gun - Will Travel (episode "High Wire," 1957), Alfred Hitchcock Presents (episode "The Last Dark Step" (1959) and "The Cuckoo Clock" (1960)), Maverick (episodes "The Naked Gallows" with Jack Kelly (1957), "The Goose-Drownder" (1959), and "The Cactus Switch" with Roger Moore (1961)), Pony Express, The Restless Gun,  The Fugitive, Bat Masterson and as Angela in Steve McQueen's Wanted: Dead or Alive (Season 2, Episode 18 (1959)).

Spain also appeared on the NBC interview program Here's Hollywood. In the 1950s and 1960s she continued to be seen frequently on television series such as Rawhide episodes, "Incident of the Valley in Shadow" (1959) and "Incident in the Middle of Nowhere" (1961) and "Incident of the Lost Woman" (1962), as well as Stoney Burke, Hogan's Heroes and The Fugitive.

In 1966, she played Calamity Jane in the episode "A Calamity Called Jane" of the syndicated series, Death Valley Days.

Death
Spain died of lymphatic cancer in Los Angeles in 1983 at age 50.

Filmography

Film

Television

References

Sources
The Fremont Argus, "Fay Spain", May 17, 1975, Page 40.
Reno Evening Gazette, "Fay Spain Comes Back To Reno", Friday, February 6, 1959, Page 22.

External links

Actresses from Phoenix, Arizona
Deaths from lymphoma
Deaths from cancer in California
American film actresses
American television actresses
1932 births
1983 deaths
20th-century American actresses